Major General Roger Anthony Powell, AM (born 23 June 1949) is a retired senior officer of the Australian Army. His last post was to serve as Deputy Force Commander of the United Nations Transitional Administration in East Timor.

Prior to that position he served as commander of Training Command – Army, and as director general of land development for the Australian Defence Headquarters. In addition, Powell served as commander of the 6th Brigade from 1993 to 1995.

Education
 Bachelor of Arts degree from University of New South Wales in 1971.
 Master's degree in educational psychology from Florida State University in 1978.

References

Australian generals
Florida State University alumni
Living people
Members of the Order of Australia
People from Canberra
Royal Military College, Duntroon graduates
University of New South Wales alumni
1949 births